Simplimorpha is a genus of moths of the family Nepticulidae.

Species
Simplimorpha lanceifoliella (Vari, 1955)
Simplimorpha promissa (Staudinger, 1870)

External links
Fauna Europaea

Nepticulidae
Monotrysia genera